Sergey Ponomarev (born July 27, 1995) is a Russian kickboxer. He is ranked as the second best middleweight in the world by Combat Press as of September 2022, and fifth best by Beyond Kick as of October 2022.

Professional career
Ponomarev faced Robert Oganesyan at the February 22, 2019, Tatneft Cup event. He won the fight by decision. Ponomarev next faced Dmitry Baranov at the July 18, 2019, Tatneft Cup event. He lost the fight by a first-round knockout, as he was stopped with a flurry of punches near the end of the opening round. It was both his first professional loss and the first stoppage loss of his career.

Ponomarev faced Konstantin Males at Fair Fight 11 on March 20, 2020. He won the fight by unanimous decision. Ponomarev was next booked to face Mikhail Sartakov at the November 28, 2020 event. He won the fight by unanimous decision. Ponomarev next faced Aliev Ali at the March 8, 2021, Fair Fight event, in a middleweight title eliminator. He won the fight by unanimous decision.

Ponomarev faced Sekou Banguru at Fair Fight XV on November 28, 2021. He won the fight by a first-round knockout, flooring Banguru with a right straight at the 1:05 minute mark of the second round.

Ponomarev was booked to face Sher Mamazulunov for the Fair Fight middleweight championship at Fair Fight XVI on February 12, 2022. He won the fight by split decision.

Ponomarev faced Serdar Yiğit Eroğlu at Ural FC 1 on July 1, 2022. He won the fight by unanimous decision.

Ponomarev faced Gadzhimurad Amirzhanov for the Russian National -86 kg title at Cup of Lotus on September 16, 2022. She won the fight by a fourth-round technical knockout, as Amirzhanov retired from the bout before the start of the fifth round.

Ponomaraev made his first Russian National title defense against Islam Murtazaev at REN TV Fight Club on February 17, 2023. He lost the fight by unanimous decision.

Titles and accomplishments

Professional
Fair Fight
 2022 Fair Fight Middleweight (-85 kg) Championship (revoked)
Russian Kickboxing Federation
 2022 Russian K-1 -86 kg Championship

Awards
2022 Russian Kickboxing Federation Fighter of the Year

Amateur
World Association of Kickboxing Organizations
2014 WAKO European Championship Light Contact (-94 kg) 
2015 WAKO World Championship Light Contact (-94 kg) 
2016 WAKO European Championship Light Contact (-94 kg) 
2017 WAKO Bestfighter World Cup (-94 kg) 
2017 WAKO World Championship Light Contact (-94 kg) 
2018 WAKO Bestfighter World Cup (-94 kg) 
2018 WAKO European Championship Light Contact (-94 kg) 
 2019 WAKO K-1 World Grand Prix -86kg 
2021 WAKO World Championship K-1 (-86 kg) 

Fight record

|-  style="background:#fbb;"
| 2023-02-17 || Loss ||align=left| Islam Murtazaev || REN TV Fight Club || Minsk, Belarus || Decision (Unanimous) || 5 || 3:00
|-
! style=background:white colspan=9 |
|-  style="background:#cfc"
| 2022-09-19 || Win ||align=left| Gadzhimurad Amirzhanov ||  Cup of Lotus || Elista, Russia || TKO (Retirement) || 4 || 3:00
|-
! style=background:white colspan=9 |
|-
|-  style="background:#cfc"
| 2022-07-01 || Win ||align=left| Serdar Yiğit Eroğlu || Ural FC 1 || Perm, Russia || Decision (Unanimous)  || 3 || 3:00
|-
|-  style="background:#c5d2ea"
| 2022-02-12 || NC||align=left| Sher Mamazulunov ||  Fair Fight XVI || Yekaterinburg, Russia || Decision (Split)  || 5 || 3:00
|-
! style=background:white colspan=9 |
|-
|-  style="background:#cfc"
| 2021-08-28 || Win ||align=left| Sekou Banguru || Fair Fight XV || Yekaterinburg, Russia || KO (Right straight)  || 2 || 1:05
|-
|-  style="background:#cfc"
| 2021-03-08 || Win ||align=left| Ali Aliyev || Fair Fight XIV || Yekaterinburg, Russia || Decision (Unanimous)  || 3 || 3:00
|-
|-  style="background:#cfc"
| 2020-11-28 || Win ||align=left| Mikhail Sartakov || Fair Fight XIII || Yekaterinburg, Russia || Decision (Unanimous)  || 3 || 3:00
|-
|-  style="background:#cfc"
| 2020-03-20 || Win ||align=left| Konstantin Males || Fair Fight XI || Yekaterinburg, Russia || Decision (Unanimous)  || 3 || 3:00
|-
|-  style="background:#fbb"
| 2019-07-18 || Loss ||align=left| Dmitry Baranov || 2019 Tatneft Cup, -80kg Semi Finals || Kazan, Russia || TKO (Punches)  || 1 || 2:48
|-
|-  style="background:#cfc"
| 2019-02-22 || Win ||align=left| Robert Oganesyan || 2019 Tatneft Cup, -80kg Quarter Finals || Russia || Ext.R Decision || 4 || 3:00
|-
|-
| colspan=9 | Legend:    

|-  style="background:#fbb"
| 2021-11- ||Loss||align=left| Aleksandar Menkovic||  2021 WAKO World Championship, Final || Jesolo, Italy || Decision (3-0) || 3 || 2:00
|-
! style=background:white colspan=9 |
|-  style="background:#cfc"
| 2021-10- ||Win||align=left| Hassan Hamilcaro||  2021 WAKO World Championship, Semi Final || Jesolo, Italy || Decision (3-0) || 3 || 2:00
|-  style="background:#cfc"
| 2021-10- ||Win||align=left| Serdar Yiğit Eroğlu||  2021 WAKO World Championship, Quarter Final || Jesolo, Italy || Decision (3-0) || 3 || 2:00
|-  style="background:#cfc"
| 2021-10- ||Win||align=left| Igor Emkic|| 2021 WAKO World Championship, 1/8 Final || Jesolo, Italy || Decision (3-0) || 3 || 2:00
|-  style="background:#cfc"
| 2021-10- ||Win||align=left| Karim Mabrouk|| 2021 WAKO World Championship, First Round || Jesolo, Italy || Decision (3-0) || 3 || 2:00

|-  style="background:#fbb"
| 2019-09-28|| Loss||align=left| Mikita Shostak||  WAKO K-1 World Grand Prix 2019, Final || Prague, Czech Republic || Decision (2-1) || 3 || 2:00
|-
! style=background:white colspan=9 |

|-  style="background:#cfc"
| 2019-09-27||Win ||align=left| Jakub Bakes||  WAKO K-1 World Grand Prix 2019, Semi Final || Prague, Czech Republic || Decision (3-0) || 3 || 2:00

|-  style="background:#cfc"
| 2019-09-26||Win ||align=left| Adam Kosut||  WAKO K-1 World Grand Prix 2019, Quarter Final || Prague, Czech Republic || Decision (3-0) || 3 || 2:00

|-  style="background:#cfc"
| 2018-11- ||Win ||align=left| Mike Hofer||  2018 WAKO European Championship, Final || Maribor, Slovenia || Decision (3-0) || 3 || 2:00
|-
! style=background:white colspan=9 |
|-  style="background:#cfc"
| 2018-10- ||Win ||align=left| Jure Drlje ||  2018 WAKO European Championship, Semi Final || Maribor, Slovenia || Decision (3-0) || 3 || 2:00
|-  style="background:#cfc"
| 2018-10- ||Win ||align=left| Roman Scherbatiuk ||  2018 WAKO European Championship, Quarter Final || Maribor, Slovenia || Decision (3-0) || 3 || 2:00
|-  style="background:#cfc"
| 2018-06-17 ||Win ||align=left| Ivan Maskaev ||  2018 WAKO Bestfighter World Cup, Final || Rimini, Italy || Decision  || 3 || 2:00
|-
! style=background:white colspan=9 |
|-  style="background:#cfc"
| 2018-06-16 ||Win ||align=left| Nico Maier ||  2018 WAKO Bestfighter World Cup, Semi Final || Rimini, Italy || Decision (2-0) || 3 || 2:00
|-  style="background:#cfc"
| 2018-06-15 ||Win ||align=left| Vegard Egeberg ||  2018 WAKO Bestfighter World Cup, Quarter Final || Rimini, Italy || Decision (3-0) || 3 || 2:00
|-  style="background:#cfc"
| 2017-11- ||Win ||align=left| Mike Hofer ||  2017 WAKO World Championship, Final || Budapest, Hungary || Decision || 3 || 2:00
|-
! style=background:white colspan=9 |
|-  style="background:#cfc"
| 2017-11- ||Win ||align=left| Hasan Mert Kizil ||  2017 WAKO World Championship, Semi Final || Budapest, Hungary || Decision (3-0)|| 3 || 2:00
|-  style="background:#cfc"
| 2017-11- ||Win ||align=left| Oleksandr Zhelepa ||  2017 WAKO World Championship, Quarter Final || Budapest, Hungary || Decision (2-1) || 3 || 2:00
|-  style="background:#fbb"
| 2017-06-16 ||Loss||align=left| Ivan Hryschuk ||  2017 WAKO Bestfighter World Cup, Semi Final || Rimini, Italy || Decision (3-0) || 3 || 2:00
|-
! style=background:white colspan=9 |
|-  style="background:#cfc"
| 2017-06-15 ||Win||align=left| Riccardo Bilato ||  2017 WAKO Bestfighter World Cup, Quarter Final || Rimini, Italy || Decision (3-0) || 3 || 2:00
|-  style="background:#cfc"
| 2016-10- ||Win ||align=left| Boris Miskovic||  2016 WAKO European Championship, Final || Maribor, Slovenia || Decision || 3 || 2:00
|-
! style=background:white colspan=9 |
|-  style="background:#cfc"
| 2016-10- ||Win ||align=left| ||  2016 WAKO European Championship, Semi Final || Maribor, Slovenia || Decision || 3 || 2:00
|-  style="background:#cfc"
| 2015-11- ||Win ||align=left| Admir Sinanbegovic ||  2015 WAKO World Championship, Final || Dublin, Ireland || Decision (3-0) || 3 || 2:00
|-
! style=background:white colspan=9 |
|-
|-  style="background:#cfc"
| 2015-11- ||Win ||align=left| Mike Hofer ||  2015 WAKO World Championship, Semi Final || Dublin, Ireland || Decision (3-0) || 3 || 2:00
|-  style="background:#cfc"
| 2015-11- ||Win ||align=left| Matia Bezzon ||  2015 WAKO World Championship, Quarter Final || Dublin, Ireland || Decision (2-1) || 3 || 2:00
|-  style="background:#fbb"
| 2014-11- ||Loss||align=left| Oleksandr Zhelepa||  2014 WAKO European Championship, Final || Maribor, Slovenia || Decision (2-1)|| 3 || 2:00
|-
! style=background:white colspan=9 |
|-  style="background:#cfc"
| 2014-11- ||Win ||align=left| Boris Miskovic||  2014 WAKO European Championship, Semi Final || Maribor, Slovenia || Decision (3-0)|| 3 || 2:00
|-  style="background:#cfc"
| 2014-11- ||Win ||align=left| Fabio Panizzolo||  2014 WAKO European Championship, Quarter Final || Maribor, Slovenia || Decision (3-0)|| 3 || 2:00
|-
|-
| colspan=9 | Legend''':

See also
 List of male kickboxers

References

Living people
1995 births
Russian male kickboxers
Sportspeople from Perm Krai